Kemal Tokak (born 25 April 1989) is a Turkish professional footballer who plays as a defender for İskenderunspor.

References 

KEMAL TOKAK BOLUSPOR'DA, koroglugazetesi.com, 5 January 2016

External links

1989 births
People from Yüreğir
Living people
Turkish footballers
Turkey youth international footballers
Turkey B international footballers
Association football defenders
Dardanelspor footballers
Samsunspor footballers
Gaziantepspor footballers
Şanlıurfaspor footballers
Elazığspor footballers
Boluspor footballers
Büyükşehir Belediye Erzurumspor footballers
Sarıyer S.K. footballers
Darıca Gençlerbirliği footballers
Tuzlaspor players
Eyüpspor footballers
İskenderun FK footballers
Süper Lig players
TFF First League players
TFF Second League players
Sportspeople from Adana